Safari Ravenna is a Safari park and Zoo in Ravenna, Emilia-Romagna, Italy, created in 2012 near the amusement park of Mirabilandia; extending over an area of 340.000 square metres. There is a large area for large mammals and birds to be seen only by car or train, and a smaller traditional zoo with the Reptile section, Primates, Australian section and domestic animals.

External links
 Official website

References 

Safari parks
Zoos in Italy
Tourist attractions in Emilia-Romagna
Parks in Emilia-Romagna
Buildings and structures in the Province of Ravenna
Zoos established in 2012
2012 establishments in Italy